[[File:Sculpture of Vibia Sabina Carthage 2.jpg|thumb|Statue of Vibia Sabina found in the wreck of the Magenta' in 1995.]]Jean-Baptiste Evariste Charles Pricot de Sainte-Marie''', born 1 October 1843 in Paris and died on 10 February 1899 in Madrid, was a French diplomat, archaeologist and epigrapher. He is the son of Jean-Baptiste Evariste Marie Pricot de Sainte-Marie.

 Diplomatic career 
 Dragoman in Tunis (1862-1865);
 Dragoman chancellor in Jeddah (1865-1866) then in Sarajevo (1866) in Pashalik of Bosnia;
 Consul in Mostar (1870-1873);
 First dragoman in Tunis (1873-1876);
 Vice-consul in Ragusa (1876-1878);
 Consul in Syros (1879) and Salonica (1889)
 Ended his career in Santander (1889) then, after the closure of the consulate, was assigned as archivist to the consulate of Madrid.

 Archaeology 
Pricot de Sainte-Marie contributes to the Geographical Society and sends statements of inscriptions from Bosnia to the Academy of Inscriptions and Belles-Lettres.

His main activity consisted of exploration missions in Tunisia between 1873 and 1876, both on the sites of Carthage and Utica. Through his explorations, he is one of the pioneers of archeology in the Beylik of Tunis.

His name remains attached to the archaeological site of Carthage as well as to the ship Magenta, which sank off the coast of Toulon in 1875 with many Carthaginian antiquities (including the more than 2,000 Pricot de Sainte-Marie steles) and which was the subject of underwater archaeological excavations between 1995 and 1998.

 Publications 
 Les Slaves méridionaux, leur origine et leur établissement dans l'Illyrie, Paris, 1874
 Mission à Carthage'', Paris, 1884

Bibliography

References

Related Article 
 Tophet of Carthage

French archaeologists
1843 births
1899 deaths